The Hassan II Academy of Sciences and Technologies is a learned society founded in 1993 by the King Hassan II of Morocco.

External links 
 

1993 establishments in Morocco
Educational institutions established in 1993
Universities and colleges in Morocco
20th-century architecture in Morocco